Cecil Harvey was a unionist politician in Northern Ireland.

Harvey was a founding elder of Ian Paisley's Free Presbyterian Church of Ulster, in 1951.  The following year, he suggested the congregation's move from Crossgar to Whiteabbey.  He was also active in the Orange Order and the Ulster Unionist Party (UUP), and was elected as a councillor.  He became disillusioned with the UUP as it came to support the idea of power-sharing, and joined the rival Vanguard Unionist Progressive Party.  Under this banner, he was elected from South Down to the Northern Ireland Assembly, 1973, where he was the party's chief whip, then the Northern Ireland Constitutional Convention.

In 1974, Harvey argued for the Orange Order to pay compensation to loyalists interned around the Ulster Workers' Council strike. By 1975, Harvey was calling for the Order to found an entirely new united unionist party; this was moved by Robert Overend but was defeated.  Undeterred, Harvey became a founder member of the United Ulster Unionist Party, becoming the party chairman, and remaining loyal until its collapse in 1984.  He then joined the Democratic Unionist Party (DUP), for which he stood unsuccessfully in South Down at the 1983 general election.

Cecil's son, Harry, later became a DUP politician.

References

Councillors in Northern Ireland
Democratic Unionist Party politicians
Members of the Northern Ireland Assembly 1973–1974
Members of the Northern Ireland Constitutional Convention
Possibly living people
Ulster Unionist Party councillors
United Ulster Unionist Party politicians
Vanguard Unionist Progressive Party politicians
Year of birth missing
Democratic Unionist Party parliamentary candidates